Thomas Roy Moore (18 December 1923 – December 1991) was an English professional footballer, who played as a central defender. Moore made 3 appearances in the Football League for Grimsby Town between 1948 and 1950, and also played non-league football for Spalding United.

Personal life
Moore came from his footballing family; his three sons – Andy, David and Kevin – and his brother Norman all also played for Grimsby Town.

References

1923 births
1991 deaths
Footballers from Grimsby
English footballers
Grimsby Town F.C. players
Spalding United F.C. players
English Football League players
Association football central defenders